Kapachira Falls are waterfalls in Malawi. They lie on the lower Shire River near the town of Chikwawa and the Majete Wildlife Reserve. The Kapichira Hydroelectric Power Station was constructed above the falls to provide hydroelectricty.

During his 1859 Zambezi Expedition, David Livingstone named them the Murchison Cataracts after the geologist Sir Roderick Murchison. His river steamer Ma Robert could not pass them to get further up the Shire; several members of his team died from disease and are buried in the area.

References

Waterfalls of Malawi